Duets: An American Classic is a studio album by Tony Bennett, released in 2006 via Columbia label.

Background
The album was released in conjunction with Bennett's 80th birthday the previous month.  The songs selected were mostly ones that Bennett had played a major role in introducing into the Great American Songbook.

Unlike some other celebrity duets efforts where performances were recorded separately and then combined by producers, such as Frank Sinatra's 1993 Duets, Bennett was physically present with each of his partners during recording. The vocals were performed live as the band was playing.

Charts
The album debuted at number 3 on The Billboard 200, selling around 202,000 copies in its first week. It spent five consecutive weeks in the top 10 and was certified Gold in less than four weeks. It also reached number one in Canada. The sequel album, Duets II, was released in 2011 in conjunction with Bennett's 85th birthday.

Grammy Awards
The album won the Grammy Award for Best Traditional Pop Vocal Album at the 2007 Grammy Awards. Bennett's duet with Stevie Wonder, "For Once in My Life", also won the Grammy Award for Best Pop Collaboration with Vocals.

Track listing

Personnel
 Tony Bennett, guest artists - vocals
 Bill Charlap - piano (track 18)
 Pinchas Zukerman - violin (track 2)
 Pamela Sklar - flute (tracks 5, 11, 13)  
 Lawrence Feldman - flute (track 3)
 Chris Botti - trumpet (track 13)
 Paul Langosch - double bass
 Gray Sargent - guitar
 Harold Jones - drums
 Jorge Calandrelli - orchestrator, conductor
 Lee Musiker - piano, arranger, musical direction
 Phil Ramone - producer
 Torrie Zito - conductor, brass arrangement
 Diane Lesser - oboe, English horn (tracks 5, 6, 11, 13)

Charts

Weekly charts

Year-end charts

Certifications

References

2006 albums
Tony Bennett albums
Columbia Records albums
Vocal duet albums
Albums arranged by Johnny Mandel
Albums produced by Phil Ramone
Grammy Award for Best Traditional Pop Vocal Album